Syrup of Maidenhair, or Capillaire, is a beverage.  It is a syrup made from adiantum (maidenhair fern) leaves.  The concentrate is sweetened with sugar or honey and is mixed with a liquid, most commonly water or milk, before drinking.

Uses
In Portugal a drink called Capilè is made of syrup of maidenhair with grated lemon zest and cold water. More modern versions uses orange flower water, water and sugar.

In 17th century Bavaria, it was added to a hot drink made from eggs, milk, and tea. In 18th century Europe, it was used in a popular milk mixed drinks.

It is an ingredient in a popular 19th-century mixed drink called Gin Punch.

See also
 List of syrups

References

Food ingredients
Syrup